Pelargoderus luteosparsus is a species of beetle in the family Cerambycidae. It is known from Masaki Matsushita in 1935, originally under the genus Nanyohammus. It feeds on Theobroma cacao and Artocarpus altilis.

References

luteosparsus
Beetles described in 1935